Azotti (Yuri Denisenko) is a Ukrainian electronic dance music DJ and Sound Producer.

Azotti has released music on labels such as Black Hole Recordings, SongBird, Mondo Records, Fenology Records and Sir Adrian Music (How Trance Works). His tracks have been repeatedly supported by top DJs such as Armin van Buuren, Paul van Dyk, Paul Oakenfold, Cosmic Gate, Richard Durand, Markus Schulz and Many More.

Biography 
Azotti was born in Kyiv, Ukraine, on 23 February 1985, and grew up in Litky (a small village on the outskirts of Kyiv). He developed an interest in electronic music at an early age.

He attended college, and later The Interregional Academy of Personnel Management, to study Accountancy. During these years Azotti showed more and more interest in sound engineering and creating music. In 2009 he became a resident DJ for one of Kyiv's clubs, Tusse, where he worked and performed for nearly 2 years. In 2011 he released his first single, “Morphology”, which was played for weeks on Sunshine Radio Germany, and for which he received great support from the world's top DJs.

After releasing several successful tracks and remixes, he collaborated with world-renowned Dutch rock band Eller Van Buuren with Bagga Bownz. The result of this collaboration was the track "Day and Night", included on the 2014 Richard Durand compilation In Search of Sunrise 12: Dubai. "Day and Night". The "Day and Night" became an opening and won the great honor of being chosen as the track to represent the entire compilation in its promotional video.

Azotti's music is played regularly on Ukrainian and world radio stations such as "Digitally Imported", "Afterhours.FM", "KISS FM Ukraine" and "DJFM Ukraine", as well as on widely-listened-to radio shows such as A State Of Trance and Anjunabeats Worldwide. Azotti has twice (2010, 2011) composed the theme for the main website for Ukrainian DJs, Topdj.ua, a site through which he has won multiple DJing contests. 
Azotti has also won many competitions in Ukraine, including a remix contest for the band SKAY, which he won with his track "Love". Over several years and until today Azotti is a resident of several projects in Kyiv's Nightclubs Saxon and Forsage.

Azotti is currently producing and releasing tracks with top labels, and winning the attention and admiration of DJs worldwide.

Discography

Singles  
2011 
 Morphology [Redux Recordings]

2012 
 The Miracle [Mondo Records]

2013 
 Shark [Mondo Records] 
 Coffee [Mondo Records]

2014 
 Dew Point (vs. MalYar) [Sir Adrian Music] 
 Black Forest (vs. WvE pres. Anna Lee) [Fenology Records] 
 Color Fields (vs. Kago Pengchi) [Mondo Records]

2015 
 Day And Night (feat. Bagga Bownz) [ Black Hole Recordings – SongBird ]  
 Back Again [ Mondo Records ]
 First Kiss [ SongBird ]

2016

 Fallen Dreams (з Bagga Bownz) [ Black Hole Recordings ]
 Desna (vs. Cyanlight) [Mondo Records]

2017

 Aurora Borealis [ Club Family Records ]

2018
 Azotti - Sultry City  [8Music]
 Azotti - Butterfly [Mondo Records]
 Azotti vs. Reese - Braveheart [Elliptical Sun Melodies]

2019
 Azotti & Darren Tate - The Solstice [Mondo Records]

Remixes 
2012 
 Zaa & Straight Up – Many Reasons [Cloudland Music] 
 Anna Lee vs. Alex Teeb – One Summer Day [Pure Magic Recordings]

2013 
 Tim Besamusca & Dj T.H. feat. Three Faces – You Got Me [Trance All-Stars Recordings]

2014 
 Azotti – The Miracle (Remixes) [Mondo Records]
 Walsh & McAuley & Katty Heath – Wider Horizon [Sir Adrian Music]
 DT8 Project – Forever In A Day [Mondo Records]

2015 
 Kenneth Thomas & Ray Violet - Amanecer [IAMPHOENIX]
 Bagga Bownz - Cereal (Azotti Remix)

2017
 Desna (vs. Cyanlight) (Atraxia Remix) [Mondo Records]

See also
 Black Hole Recordings
 SongBird

References

Living people
1985 births
Ukrainian electronic musicians
Remixers
Club DJs
Black Hole Recordings artists
Ukrainian record producers
Ukrainian trance musicians
Ukrainian DJs
Musicians from Kyiv
Electronic dance music DJs